Events from the 7th century in Ireland.

600s
601
Probable year in which Colmán mac Cobthaig, Uí Fiachrach becomes king of Connacht.

602 or 604
 Death of Áed mac Diarmato or Áed Sláine (Áed of Slane), the son of Diarmait mac Cerbaill. Legendary stories exist of Áed's birth. Killed his nephew and was in turn slain by his grandnephew.

603
 Death of Brandub mac Echach an Irish king of the Uí Cheinnselaig of Leinster. His father, Echu mac Muiredaig had been a king of the Ui Cheinnselaig. They belonged to a branch known as the Uí Felmeda.

605
 Birth of Colmán of Lindisfarne (died February 18, 675) also known as Saint Colmán, Bishop of Lindisfarne from 661 until 664. Colman resigned the Bishopric of Lindisfarne after the Synod of Whitby called by King Oswiu of Northumbria decided to calculate Easter using the method of the First Ecumenical Council instead of his preferred Celtic method. After his resignation he retired to live on the island of Inishbofin in Galway where he founded a monastery.

607
 Áed Uaridnach or Áed mac Domnail''' (died 612), ended his reign as High King of Ireland. He is sometimes also known as Áed  Allán, a name usually reserved for the 8th-century king of the same name, this Áed's great-great-grandson.

608
 Death of Fiachra Cáech, brother of Fiachnae mac Báetáin king of the Dál nAraidi and high-king of the Ulaid in the early 7th century.

609
 Death of Saint Molua (also known as Lua, Da Lua), was an Irish saint, and a Christian abbot. He was the founder of Killaloe, which bears his name Lua.

610s
610
 Death of Conall Laeg Breg mac Áedo Sláine, a King of Brega from the Síl nÁedo Sláine branch of the southern Uí Néill. He was the son of the high king Áed Sláine mac Diarmato (died 602). He ruled from 602-610. He is not called King of Brega in the annals but is second in a poem on the rulers of Síl nÁedo Sláine in the Book of Leinster.

611
 Suibne Menn or Suibne mac Fiachnai (died 628) was an Irish king who is counted as a High King of Ireland and started his reign in 611.

612
 Death of Áed Uaridnach, High King of Ireland until 607.

613
 Death of Rónán mac Colmáin of the Uí Dúnlainge, son of Colmán Már mac Coirpri. The Annals of Tigernach includes his death obit with the title King of Laigin, that is King of Leinster These annals interpolated dates for some Leinster kings in this period from the king lists.

615
 Death of Saint Columbanus at Bobbio (now in northern Italy)

616
 Death of Áedán mac Mongain, of the Ui Echach Coba branch of the Dal nAraide and father of Fergus mac Áedáin, a king of Ulaid from 674-692.

618
 Death of Saint Kevin of Glendalough.
 Death of Fíngen mac Áedo Duib, also known as Fingen Flann, a King of Munster. His sobriquet Flann meant "blood-red".
 Death of Áed Bennán mac Crimthainn was a possible King of Munster from the Eóganacht Locha Léin branch of the Eoganachta. He was definitely king of West Munster or Iarmuman. He was the great grandson of Dauí Iarlaithe mac Maithni also a possible king of Munster from this branch.

620s
620
 Death of Saint Finbarr (born c. 550), Bishop of Cork and patron saint for the city and diocese of Cork.

621
 The murder of the relatives of Baetan at Magh Slécht

622Battle of Cennbag (at Cambo, modern County Roscommon): death of Colmán mac Cobthaig, Uí Fiachrach king of Connacht, succeeded by his son Guaire Aidne mac Colmáin

623
 Suibne Menn or Suibne mac Fiachnai (died 628) was an Irish king who is counted as a High King of Ireland and ended his reign in 623.

624
 Domnall mac Áedo (died 642) was a son of Áed mac Ainmuirech; he was High King of Ireland from 624 until his death. He belonged to the Cenél Conaill kindred of the northern Uí Néill.

625
 Death of Rónán mac Colmáin was a King of Leinster following Brandub mac Echach (died 603). He belonged to the Uí Cheinnselaig and was the son of Colmán mac Cormaicc. The later Leinster king Crundmáel Erbuilc mac Rónáin (died 655) was his son.

626
 Fiachnae mac Báetáin was killed at the Battle of Leithet Midind, defeated by Fiachnae mac Demmáin of the Dál Fiatach.

627
 Death of Cathal mac Áedo Flaind Chathrach, king of Munster.

627 or 628
 Possible year of birth of Saint Adomnán of Iona

629
 The Battle of Carn Feradaig (Carhernarry, County Limerick); Guaire Aidne mac Colmáin, king of Connacht suffered a defeat at the hands of the Munster king Faílbe Flann mac Áedo Duib.

630s
630
 Approximate date of the foundation of Fore Abbey at the modern village of Fore, County Westmeath

632
 31 January: death of St. Aedan of Ferns (born 550), an early bishop of Ferns.
 Death of Colman MacDuagh co-founder the Kilmacduagh monastery

632 or 633
 Death of the legendary Mór Muman (632 according to the Annals of Ulster, 633 according to the Annals of Tigernach)

633
 Possible beginning of the reign of Máel Dúin mac Áedo Bennán, a King of Iarmuman (west Munster)

634
 Death of Áed Dammán, called a King of Iarmumu in his obituary. He was an uncle of Máel Dúin mac Áedo Bennán.

635
 Mochuda (St. Carthage) and eight hundred of his community were expelled from Rahan near modern Tullamore, County Offaly by Blathmaic, a Meathian prince.

636
 Battle of Maigh Rath (Moira, County Down).
 Battle of Áth Goan in the western Liffey plain for the kingship of Leinster involved Faílbe Flann mac Áedo Duib.

637
 14 May: Death of Abbot Mo Chutu of Lismore.
 Death of Conall mac Suibni, called Conall Guthbinn, a King of Uisnech in Mide of the Clann Cholmáin since 621.

639
 14 May: Death of St. Mo Chutu of Lismore, Abbot.
 Death of Faílbe Flann mac Áedo Duib, king of Munster.
 Death of St. Molaise of Leighlin (also known as Laisrén and Laserian), a missionary who worked in both Ireland and Scotland.
 Death of St. Gobhan, Abbot, founder of St Laserian's Cathedral, Old Leighlin and founder of Killamery monastery.

640s
640
 Likely date of Adamnán joining the Columban familia (i.e. the federation of monasteries under the leadership of Iona Abbey). He is to become the eighth Abbot of Iona.
 Birth of Saint Kilian, an Irish missionary bishop and the apostle of Franconia (modern-day northern Bavaria), at Mullagh (in modern-day County Cavan).

641
 Death of Cúán mac Amalgado, a King of Munster from the Áine branch of the Eóganachta and son of a previous king, Amalgaid mac Éndai (died 601). He succeeded Faílbe Flann mac Áedo Duib in 639.

642
 Birth of Máel Ruba (Old Irish spelling), or Malruibhe (died 722), sometimes Latinised as Rufus, a monk, originally from Bangor, County Down, and founder of the monastic community of Applecross in Ross, one of the best attested early Christian monasteries in modern-day Scotland.
 Death of Domnall mac Áedo, a High King of Ireland since 624 or 628.

643
 Death of Dúnchad mac Fiachnai, who is mentioned as king of Ulaid at the time of his death.
 
644
 Battle of Cenn Con in Munster between Máel Dúin, son of Áed Bennán, and Aengus Liath of Glendamnach.
 Death of Aengus Liath.

646
 Death of Lochéne mac Finguine, a king of the Dal nAraide.

647
 Death of Scandal mac Bécce, a king of the Dal nAraide.

648
 Death of Máel Cobo mac Fiachnai, a Dal Fiatach king of Ulaid. He was the son of Fiachnae mac Demmáin (died 629).

649
Death of Rogallach mac Uatach, a king of Connacht from the Uí Briúin branch of the Connachta.

650s
650
The Book of Durrow is begun.

652
 August 12: death of Ségéne mac Fiachnaí, or Ségéne of Iona, the fifth abbot of Iona. Suibne moccu Fir Thrí becomes the sixth Abbot of Iona.

653
 Death of Máel Dóid mac Suibni, a king of Uisnech in Mide of the Clann Cholmáin. He was a son of Suibne mac Colmáin (died 598) and brother of Conall Guthbinn mac Suibni (died 637), previous kings. He ruled from 637 to 653.
 Marcán mac Tommáin, 15th King of the Uí Maine.
654
 Death of Flannesda, a son of Domnall mac Áedo (died 642), High King of Ireland.

655
Death of Laidgnen/Loingsech mac Colmáin, son of Colmán mac Cobthaig, king of Connacht from the Ui Fiachrach branch of the Connachta.

656
 Death of Crunnmael mac Suibni Menn, a King of Ailech

657
 Death of St. Ultan of Ardbraccan, an Irish saint and Abbot-Bishop of Ardbraccan

658
 Death of Blathmac, son of the first Uí Cheinnselaig king, Rónán mac Colmáin (died 625)

659
 Death of Ailill, brother of Fínsnechta Fledach mac Dúnchada who was High King of Ireland.

660s
660
 Death of Conall Crandomna, king of Dál Riata. He is succeeded by Domangart mac Domnaill.Bannerman, John, Studies in the History of Dalriada. Scottish Academic Press, Edinburgh, 1974. 

661
 Death of Laidcenn mac Buith Bannaig, poet.
 Death of Máenach mac Fíngin, a King of Munster from the Cashail branch of the Eoganachta.

662
 Conall and Colgu, two sons of Domhnall, son of Aedh, son of Ainmire, were slain by Ceirrceann.

662 or 663
 Death of Guaire Aidne mac Colmáin, son of Colmán mac Cobthaig, King of Connacht: he is succeeded by Muirchertach Nar mac Guaire Aidne

664-666
 A major yellow plague hits much of the island

664
 May 3: an eclipse of the sun was visible from Ireland.
 The Annals of the Four Masters  records the following deaths:

665
 Yellow plague outbreak at Fore Abbey
 Cathal Cú-cen-máthair, King of Munster, dies in the plague

666
 The Battle of Aine, between the Aradha and Ui Fidhgeinte, where Eoghan, son of Crunnmael, was slain.
 The Battle of Fertas (Belfast) was fought between the Ulaid and the Cruithne and Cathussach mac Luirgéne, their king, was defeated and slain.
 The Annals of the Four Masters records the following deaths:

 Death of Cellach mac Guairi, a son of Guaire Aidne mac Colmáin, a king of Connacht
 Death of Fáelán mac Colmáin, a king of Leinster from the Uí Dúnlainge branch of the Laigin. He was the son of Colmán Már mac Coirpri, a previous king.
 Probable date of the death of Eochaid Iarlaithe, a son of Fiachnae mac Báetáin.

667
 Mayo Abbey, founded by St Colman for Saxon monks who had followed him from Lindisfarne following a Church row about how to calculate when Easter falls.

668
 Deaths of two of the three known sons of Guaire Aidne mac Colmáin; Artgal mac Guairi and Muirchertach Nár mac Guairi, a king of Connacht.

669
 February 24: death of Cumméne Find, seventh abbot of Iona. Fáilbe mac Pípáin becomes the eight abbot of Iona

670s
670
 Death of Blathmac mac Máele Cobo, was a Dal Fiatach king of Ulaid. He was the son of Máel Cobo mac Fiachnai (died 648).

671
 Death of Sechnassach mac Blathmaic  who had followed his father Blathmac mac Áedo Sláine (died 665) and his uncle Diarmait mac Áedo Sláine (died 665) as High King of Ireland and King of Brega. He belonged to the Síl nÁedo Sláine kindred of the southern Uí Néill which took its name from his grandfather Áed Sláine (died 602).

672
 Cenn Fáelad mac Blathmaic (died 675) followed his father Blathmac mac Áedo Sláine (died 665) and his brother Sechnassach (died 671) as High King of Ireland and king of Brega.

673
 Cenn Fáelad mac Blathmaic ended his reign as High King.

674
 Death of Congal Cennfota mac Dúnchada, a Dal Fiatach king of Ulaid. He was the son of Dùnchad mac Fiachnai (died 644). His nickname Cennfota means Long-headed.

675
 Death of Cenn Fáelad mac Blathmaic.

676
 Fínsnechta Fledach (died 695) of the Síl nÁedo Sláine destroyed Ailech, center of Cenél nEógain power.

677
 At the Battle of Loch Gabor (Lagore, County Meath) the Laigin fought with the high king Fínsnechta Fledach. There was slaughter on both sides but Finsnechta emerged the victor.

678
 Death of King of Munster Colgú mac Faílbe Flaind

679
 Death of Cenn Fáelad mac Aillila, Irish scholar and poet and grandson of Colmán Rímid.

680s
680
 Death of Fiannamail mac Máele Tuile, a King of Leinster from the Uí Máil branch of the Laigin.

681
 Death of Dúngal Eilni mac Scandail a Dal nAraide king of the Cruithne. He came to the rule of these tribes some time after 668. In 681 he and Cenn Fáelad mac Suibne, chief of Cianachta Glinne Geimhin were burned by Máel Dúin mac Máel Fithrich of the Cenél nEógan at Dún Ceithirn.

682
 Death of Cenn Fáelad mac Colgan, a King of Connacht from the Uí Briúin branch of the Connachta. He was of the branch which developed into the Uí Briúin Seóla, who were centred around Tuam in modern County Galway.

683
 Death of Dúnchad Muirisci mac Tipraite, a King of Connacht from the Uí Fiachrach branch of the Connachta. He was of the Uí Fiachrach Muaidhe sept based along the River Moy.

684
 June: King Ecgfrith of Northumbria sent an expedition to Ireland under his ealdorman Berht, laying waste to the territory of Fínsnechta Fledach, King of Brega.

685
 Bressal mac Fergusa, son of Fergus mac Áedáin King of Ulaid died of disease which was rampant at the time.

688
 Fínsnechta Fledach abdicated as king of Brega and High King of Ireland to become a monk. He reclaimed the crowns the following year, 689, and abandoned monasticism.
 At the Battle of Imlech Pich, Niall mac Cernaig Sotal (died 701), a king in southern Brega of the Uí Chernaig sept of Lagore of the Síl nÁedo Sláine defeated Congalach mac Conaing Cuirre (died 696) of Uí Chonaing and his Ciannachta allies.

690s
690
 Death of Aillil mac Dúngail Eilni, a chief of the Dal nAraide and son of Dúngal Eilni mac Scandail (died 681)

691
Death of Fithceallach mac Flainn, a king Uí Maine

692
 Death of Fergus mac Áedáin, a king of Ulaid from 674. He was the first member of the Dal nAraide to hold the throne since death of Congal Cáech at Mag Roth in 639. He was of the Ui Echach Coba branch of the Dal nAraide and was the son of Áedán mac Mongain (died 616).

693
 Death of Bran Mut mac Conaill, a King of Leinster from the Uí Dúnlainge branch of the Laigin. He was the grandson of Fáelán mac Colmáin (died 666), a previous king. He ruled from 680 until his death.

694
 Loingsech mac Óengusso (died 704), an Irish king, becomes High King of Ireland. The Chronicle of Ireland'' records the beginning of Loingsech's reign as 696, having recorded the killing of his predecessor Fínsnechta Fledach the year previously.

695
 Death of Fínsnechta Fledach mac Dúnchada, High King of Ireland, who belonged to the southern Síl nÁedo Sláine sept of the Uí Néill and was King of Brega in modern County Meath.

696
 17 June: death of Saint Moling, the second Bishop of Ferns. The town of Monamolin in County Wexford is named for him.
 Death of Finguine mac Cathail Con-cen-máthair, a King of Munster from the Glendamnach branch of the Eoganachta.
 Death of Congalach mac Conaing Cuirre, a King of Brega from the Uí Chonaing sept of the Síl nÁedo Sláine branch of the southern Uí Néill.

697
Synod of Birr and the proclamation of the Cáin Adomnáin (Law of the Innocents).

698
 Death of Áed Aired, a king of the Dal nAraide.

700s
700
End of archaic Old Irish period (from c. AD 500)

References